Dick Figures is an American adult-oriented animated comedy series created and written by Ed Skudder and Zack Keller.

Series overview

Episodes

Pilot

Season 1 (2010–11)

Season 2 (2011)

Season 3 (2011–2012)

Season 4 (2012)

Season 5 (2013–2014)
Season 5's release and production was subject to two large hiatuses. Due to the production of the movie, season 5's production was put on hold until after the movie was done so there was a one-year gap between the end of season 4 and the beginning of season 5. A hiatus also occurred between episodes 3 and 4 due to both the weekly release of the movie starting on September 17, 2013 and the crew taking a break from the year-long production of the movie. Regular release of the season resumed in April 2014.

As well as being released on YouTube for free viewing, the season was also available to buy in advance to the YouTube release.

Movie (2013)
Dick Figures: The Movie was released on September 17, 2013. On the same day, it was split up into 12 different chapters and released weekly on YouTube. The full movie can be seen now for online streaming on Yekra, Amazon.com, Hulu and Netflix and can be purchased for digital download through iTunes, Google Play, Vudu, PlayStation Network, and Xbox.

Messin' With Sasquatch (2015)

References

Lists of web series episodes
Lists of American adult animated television series episodes